Vladko Kostadinov (born 13 February 1987 in Varna) is a Bulgarian football midfielder. He was raised in Cherno More's youth teams.

References

External links
Stats at Euronews

1987 births
Living people
Bulgarian footballers
First Professional Football League (Bulgaria) players
Association football midfielders
PFC Cherno More Varna players
FC Chernomorets Balchik players